"Lay a Little Lovin' on Me" is a 1970 song written by Jeff Barry, Robin McNamara, and Jim Cretecos and recorded by Robin McNamara. The song reached number 11 on the Billboard Hot 100, and was McNamara's only hit.  "Lay A Little Lovin' On Me" also peaked at number 6 (for two weeks) on Canada's national RPM Top 100 singles chart in August 1970 (#80 YearEnd), and at number 49 in Australia in 1970.

Cover versions
A cover version was released by country singer Jody Miller in 1979. Miller's version reached number 97 on the Billboard Hot Country Singles chart.

References

1970 singles
1979 singles
Jody Miller songs
Epic Records singles
Songs written by Jeff Barry